The Luxembourg men's national under 20 ice hockey team is the national under-20 ice hockey team of Luxembourg. The team is controlled by the Luxembourg Ice Hockey Federation, a member of the International Ice Hockey Federation.

History
Luxembourg played its first game in 2001 during a qualification game against Iceland for participation in Division III of the 2002 World Junior Ice Hockey Championships. The game was held in Luxembourg City, Luxembourg, with Luxembourg losing 6-2. The game was part of a three team qualification tournament which included Iceland, Ireland and Luxembourg. The tournament was won by Iceland who won both of their games and gained promotion to the 2002 World Junior Ice Hockey Championships, resulting in Luxembourg failing to qualify. During the tournament Luxembourg won their first ever international game 10-0 against Ireland.

In 2003 Luxembourg competed in Division III of the 2003 World Junior Ice Hockey Championships, held in Izmit, Turkey. The tournament included teams from Australia, Belgium, South Korea, and Turkey. Luxembourg finished last in the tournament after losing all four of their games, including one game against South Korea which they lost 17-0 being recorded as their worst ever loss in international participation.

International competitions
2001 World Junior Ice Hockey Championships Division III Qualification. Finish: 2nd
2003 World Junior Ice Hockey Championships. Finish: 5th in Division III (39th overall)

See also
Luxembourg men's national ice hockey team

References

External links
Luxembourg Ice Hockey Federation 

Jun
Junior national ice hockey teams
Men's sport in Luxembourg
Youth sport in Luxembourg